Revolting Rhymes is a 1982 collection of Roald Dahl poems first published in 1982 originally under the title Roald Dahl's Revolting Rhymes. A parody of traditional folk tales in verse, Dahl gives a re-interpretation of six well-known fairy tales, featuring surprise endings in place of the traditional happily-ever-after finishes. The poems are illustrated by Quentin Blake. It is the shortest children's book Dahl ever wrote.

Contents
There are a total of six poems in the book, each of the featured fairy tales humorously deviating from the traditional version.

In Cinderella, the plot stayed true to the original tale until one of the ugly sisters switches her shoe with the one Cinderella left behind at the ball. However, when the prince sees that the shoe fits one of the sisters, he decides not to marry her, and instead chops off her head on the spot while she is standing. When the prince removes the head of the second sister and makes to do the same to Cindy, she wishes to be married instead to a decent man. Her fairy godmother grants this wish and marries her to a simple, regular jam-maker.

In Jack and the Beanstalk, the beanstalk grows golden leaves towards the top. Jack's mother sends him up to fetch them, but when Jack hears the giant threaten to eat him after the giant smells him, he descends without collecting any of the gold. Jack's mother then ascends herself after accusing Jack of being smelly, but is eaten.  Undeterred, Jack decides to bathe, and then climbs up and collects the leaves himself, as the giant is now unable to smell him since he is clean. Now rich, Jack resolves to bathe every day.

Snow White and the Seven Dwarfs begins familiarly, but after the huntsman agrees not to kill Snow White, she takes a job as a cook and maid for seven former jockeys (the dwarfs). Although those jockeys are compulsive gamblers on horse racing, they are not particularly successful. So Snow White resolves to help them, and sneaks back to steal the magic mirror, which can correctly predict the winning horse and makes the seven jockeys (and Snow White) millionaires, with the moral that "Gambling is not a sin / Provided that you always win".

Goldilocks and the Three Bears has a slightly different set-up to the rest of the poems, in that the story is kept the same as the traditional tale, but with continual comments from the narrator about how appalling Goldilocks is and how anyone with any sense would take the bears' side over hers (with the narrator telling the story as if talking to the Mother Bear). After the end, the narrator says that they would prefer an ending where the three bears come back and eat Goldilocks.

In Little Red Riding Hood and the Wolf, based on Little Red Riding Hood, the wolf enters the grandmother's house and devours her before putting on her clothes to eat Little Red Riding Hood next. Riding Hood is not disturbed however, and calmly pulls a pistol out of her underwear and shoots the wolf ("The small girl smiles/Her eyelid flickers/She whips a pistol from her knickers/She aims it at the creature's head and BANG! BANG! BANG! she shoots him ... dead.") – yielding her a new wolfskin coat.

In The Three Little Pigs, the wolf quickly blows down the houses of straw and sticks, devouring the first two pigs. The third house of bricks is too strong, so the wolf resolves to come back that evening with dynamite. The third pig has other plans, however, and asks Little Red Riding Hood to come and deal with the wolf.  Ever the sharpshooter, Red Riding Hood gains a second wolfskin coat and a pigskin travelling case.

Audio book
An audio book of Dahl's Revolting Rhymes was released, read by Timothy West and Prunella Scales; this version was also turned into an OVA by Abbey Home Entertainment in 1990 as part of their Tempo Video range. A later version was narrated by Scottish actor Alan Cumming. The current audiobook is narrated by Stephen Mangan, Tamsin Greig and Miriam Margolyes and has available at least since 2014.

Animated adaptations
The book, as explained above, was adapted into an OVA that was done in the style of Quentin Blake's illustrations. The book was later adapted into a two-part CGI special for BBC One, first shown on 26 and 27 December 2016. It was nominated at the 90th Academy Awards for Best Animated Short.

References

Children's books by Roald Dahl
Children's poetry books
Poetry by Roald Dahl
1982 children's books
1982 poetry books
Collections of fairy tales
British poetry collections
Literature based on fairy tales
Jonathan Cape books
Works based on Little Red Riding Hood
Works based on The Three Little Pigs
Works based on Goldilocks and the Three Bears
Works based on Jack and the Beanstalk
Works based on Snow White
Works based on Cinderella
Nonsense poetry
Fairy tale parodies